Aita Gasparin (born 9 February 1994 in Samedan) is a Swiss biathlete. She competed at the Biathlon World Championships 2013, and at the 2014 Winter Olympics in Sochi, in the individual contest.

She is the sister of fellow biathletes Selina Gasparin and Elisa Gasparin.

References

External links
 

1994 births
Living people
Biathletes at the 2014 Winter Olympics
Biathletes at the 2018 Winter Olympics
Swiss female biathletes
Olympic biathletes of Switzerland
Biathletes at the 2012 Winter Youth Olympics
People from Maloja District
Sportspeople from Graubünden